Jannat Makan (also Romanized as Jannat Makān; also known as Jalakān, Jallākān, and Jallekān) is a city in the Central District of Gotvand County, Khuzestan Province, Iran.  At the 2006 census, its population was 5,893, in 1,086 families.

References

Populated places in Gotvand County

Cities in Khuzestan Province